Emuhaya Constituency is an electoral constituency in Kenya. It is one of five constituencies in Vihiga County, in the former Western Province. The constituency was established for the 1963 elections.

The constituency was represented by Kenneth Marende of the Orange Democratic Movement (ODM) before he was elected as the Speaker of the National Assembly in January 2008. Wilbur Ottichilo became the representative in a by-election in 2008. In 2013 the constituency was split into two, Emuhaya and Luanda.

Members of Parliament

Wards

References

Constituencies in Vihiga County
Constituencies of Western Province (Kenya)
1963 establishments in Kenya
Constituencies established in 1963